Rewari Assembly constituency is one of the 90 Vidhan Sabha constituencies in Haryana state in northern India. It is comes under Gurgaon Lok Sabha constituency.

Members of Legislative Assembly

Election Results

2019 result

See also
 Rewari
 List of constituencies of the Haryana Legislative Assembly

References

Assembly constituencies of Haryana
Rewari district